Curve Lake First Nation is a Mississauga Ojibway First Nation located in Peterborough County of Ontario.  Curve Lake First Nation occupies three reserves; Curve Lake First Nation 35, Curve Lake 35A, and Islands in the Trent Waters Indian Reserve 36A. The last of these reserves is shared with the Hiawatha First Nation and the Scugog First Nation.  Curve Lake First Nation has a registered membership of 2,415 as of October 2019 with 793 registered band members living in Curve Lake and an additional 1,622 registered band members living off-reserve.

History
The Curve Lake Anishinaabe (Ojibway) community trace their origins to 1829 when a small band settled around Curve Lake and Mud Lake.  The community officially became a reserve in 1837.  Mud Lake Band #35, became Curve Lake First Nation in 1964, with the Mud Lake 35 Indian Reserve becoming the Curve Lake First Nation 35 Indian Reserve.

Governance
Curve Lake First Nation adopted a custom election code after a community approval vote in 2015. The First Nation's council consists of a chief and eight councillors. The current chief is Keith Knott.  The councillors are Jeff Jacobs, Laurie Hockaday, Nodin Knott, Kenny Jacobs, Steve Toms, Arnold Taylor, Deborah Jacobs and Sean Conway. Their three-year term began in June 2022.

Services
 Education
 Health and Family Services
 Economic Development
 Capital Projects
 Public Works
 Membership
 Lands
 Curve Lake Community Gaming Revenue Fund
 Employment Resource Centre
 Cultural Centre

Notable people
 Cara Gee, actress
 Elsie Knott, first known woman chief in Canada
 Albert Smoke (1894–1944), Olympic long-distance runner
 Drew Hayden Taylor, columnist and playwright

References

External links

AANDC profile
Aboriginal Canada Portal

First Nations governments in Ontario
Communities in Peterborough County
Mississaugas